The Shanghai–Hangzhou high-speed railway, also known as the Huhang high-speed railway or Huhang passenger railway is a high-speed rail line in China between Shanghai and Hangzhou, Zhejiang. It was built in 20 months and opened on October 26, 2010. The line shortened travel time between the two cities from 78 to 45 minutes. The line is also used by trains departing Shanghai's terminals for Nanchang, Changsha, Guiyang, and Kunming making it part of the Shanghai–Kunming High-Speed Railway. It has made the proposed Shanghai–Hangzhou Maglev Line unlikely.

Speed records
In September 2010, a test train on the Shanghai-Hangzhou high-speed line achieved a speed of   setting a Chinese train speed record.

Etymology
"" is the official abbreviation for Shanghai and "" stands for Hangzhou, the capital city of Zhejiang Province.

Railway Stations 
There are nine railway stations on the line: 
Shanghai Hongqiao railway station
Songjiang South railway station
Jinshan North railway station
Jiashan South railway station
Jiaxing South railway station
Tongxiang railway station
Haining West railway station
Linping South railway station
Hangzhou East railway station
Hangzhou railway station
On July 1, 2013, the new Hangzhou East station was opened which serves the Shanghai–Hangzhou Passenger Railway, as well as the Hangzhou–Ningbo high-speed railway, the Nanjing–Hangzhou Passenger Railway, and the Hangzhou–Changsha high-speed railway.

References 

Rail transport in Shanghai
Transport in Hangzhou
High-speed rail in China
Railway lines opened in 2010